Aussie Racing Cars (ARC) is an Australian motor racing category. ARC is a motorcycle powered silhouette racing car class created by former touring car racer Phil Ward and influenced by the American Legends category. Aussie Racing Cars was developed as a Major National Category supporting the V8 Supercars under an exclusive Category Management Agreement (CMA) with the Confederation of Australian Motorsport (CAMS).

Initially, the cars were based on caricatures of 1940 Ford Coupe and FJ Holden body styles until in 2007 a new era of Aussie Race Car emerged with the design and launch of the Toyota Aurion bodied Aussie Race Car. The new car extended the wheelbase and track on the first generation cars thus improving performance significantly. Respected design engineer Russell Mapplebeck lead the engineering project alongside James Ward and Blake Hammond.  The process to design and build the first "New Age" Aussie Race Car paved the way for future models, also designed by Mapplebeck including Mercedes- Benz, Holden Cruze, and later the Camaro and Mustang. Aussie Race Cars are now regarded as one of the most successful motorsport categories of all time in Australia, operating under the same branding and philosophy for over 20 years and this success is largely attributed to the substantial improvements in visual appeal and performance delivered from Mapplebeck's New Age design.

Ward sold the category in April 2012 to Tony Quinn with the Ward brothers of James and Brad continuing to work in the business under Quinn's ownership.

The category contests an annual Aussie Racing Car Series which is approved by the Confederation of Australian Motor Sport as a National Series. Over its 20-year history the category has supported the biggest motorsports events in Australia including the Adelaide 500, Indy 500 Gold Coast, F1 Australian Grand Prix and Bathurst 1000.

The most successful drivers in the category are Paul Kemal who has won the series title three times, James Duckworth and Mike Russell twice, while Phil Ward's two sons James and Brad have also won titles.

The Hampton Downs round of the 2016 season hosted the inaugural Trans-Tasman Woman's Challenge. Charlotte Poynting was chosen to represent Team Australian up against Alyssa Clapperton representing Team New Zealand. In Race 3 Poynting who started 9th on the grid, raced through the field to win by 2.5 seconds, becoming the first ever woman to win a race in the Aussie Racing Cars category.

Two time Series winner James Duckworth is the only driver since Mike Russell to win consecutive Drivers championships.

Cars

The Aussie Racing Car combines current racing technology and performance in a one-design class where all cars are mechanically identical with strict rules in place to maintain that position. Various body styles are permitted. Originally only 1940 Ford Coupé and Holden FJ body styles were available, with Ford AU Falcon and Holden VY Commodore styles which replicate V8 Supercars later made available. A Toyota Aurion body shape was launched in 2008, followed by a Holden Cruze in 2012 and a Mercedes-Benz inspired "Euro GT" in 2013. Nissan Altima, Ford Mustang, and Chevrolet Camaro were added in 2014. Hyundai Elantra debuted during the 2015 series.
 
Cars are constructed on a purpose built  steel tubular space frame chassis with integral roll cage construction designed and approved to stringent engineering specifications. The lightweight composite body is a designed caricature of its full size counterpart featuring opening doors, boot and lift off front section. Powered by a 1.3 litre  twin cam 16 valve engine sourced second-hand from used Yamaha FJR1300 motorcycles that revs to 11500 rpm. The 515 kg all up weight provides a high power-to-weight ratio that allows the car to reach speeds in excess of 200 km/h. Lap times achieved at Oran Park Raceway are within six seconds of a V8 Supercar.  They feature fully adjustable suspension geometry, performance brakes and controlled competition tyres that produce high grip levels. All cars are hand built in the ARC facility and supplied ready to race.

The cockpit layout is purpose built and fitted with a five point racing harness. The steering requires only one turn lock to lock and minimal steering movement during racing. The sequential gear lever is close to the steering wheel and the carbon fibre dash displays the necessary instrumentation. The chassis design incorporates simplicity in suspension adjustment to cater for all drivers preferences including castor/camber, sway bar, roll centre and ride height etc. Brakes have front to rear bias adjustment.

The class has proven attractive to karting racers without the budget to progress to Formula Ford. Aussie Racing Cars is by far the most cost effective 1st tier category in Australia and New Zealand.

Series winners

Technical specifications

Engine
Yamaha 1.3 (1300cc) litre twin-cam water/air cooled four cylinder
Four valves per cylinder
125 bhp, 11500 rpm (Governed)

Cooling
PWR radiator and oil cooler

Gearbox
Integral 5-speed dog engagement
Sequential manual gearbox

Dash
Electronic dash programmed to ARC specifications. Shift light, tachometer, water-temp and lap-timer

Chassis
Tubular space-frame and cockpit with integral driver roll-cage
Momo race seat with five point harness
Momo quick-release steering wheel

Suspension
Front – Coil over shocks fully adjustable rose jointed wishbones
Ultra fast rack and pinion
Rear – Live axle, optional long and short track ratios
Coil over shocks, parallel trailing arms, panhard rod

Brakes
Disc brakes - Full bias adjustment with balance bar, braided lines

Wheels and tyres
13 x 5.5 various styles available
Yokohama A048R treaded race spec tyres

Body styles
 Chevrolet Camaro 
 Euro GT
 Ford Falcon AU
 Ford Mustang
 Holden Commodore VY
 Holden Cruze
 Nissan Altima
 Toyota Aurion

Dimensions
Length: 3.0 m
Width: 1.35 m
Height: 1.05 m
Weight: 515 kg

Speed
Top Speed: 230 km/h
0-100: 4.9 seconds
0-400m: 11.9 seconds

References

External links
Official Site

Motorsport categories in Australia
Aussie Racing Cars